Maketu is a small town on the Bay of Plenty Coast in New Zealand.

Maketu is located in the Western Bay of Plenty, New Zealand. Maketu has an estuary from which the Kaituna River used to flow. It is also adjacent to Newdicks Beach located on the south eastern side of Okurei Point.

Maketu is rich in ancestral Māori culture, specifically the Te Arawa tribe. Maketu was the landing site of the Te Arawa canoe. The Chief who led the voyage of the Te Arawa waka from Hawaiki to New Zealand/Aotearoa was known as Tametekapua. Many Māori settled in Maketu, but some continued their journey inland, using the Kaituna River as far as Rotorua. Maketu is named after an ancient kūmara (sweet potato) pit in Hawaiki, the Māori ancestral homeland.

Maketu has a predominantly Māori population, although in recent years there has been an influx of many cultures to Maketu.

In 2011, Maketu was one of many areas along the Bay of Plenty Coast affected by the grounding of the MV Rena and the subsequent oil spill.

The Waihi Estuary Wildlife Management Reserve is located in Maketu.

Demographics

Maketu had a population of 1,197 at the 2018 New Zealand census, an increase of 150 people (14.3%) since the 2013 census, and an increase of 21 people (1.8%) since the 2006 census. There were 408 households, comprising 594 males and 606 females, giving a sex ratio of 0.98 males per female. The median age was 41.1 years (compared with 37.4 years nationally), with 231 people (19.3%) aged under 15 years, 228 (19.0%) aged 15 to 29, 522 (43.6%) aged 30 to 64, and 219 (18.3%) aged 65 or older.

Ethnicities were 47.6% European/Pākehā, 66.9% Māori, 7.8% Pacific peoples, 1.0% Asian, and 0.8% other ethnicities. People may identify with more than one ethnicity.

The percentage of people born overseas was 9.8, compared with 27.1% nationally.

Although some people chose not to answer the census's question about religious affiliation, 48.4% had no religion, 35.3% were Christian, 5.8% had Māori religious beliefs, 0.3% were Hindu and 2.3% had other religions.

Of those at least 15 years old, 114 (11.8%) people had a bachelor's or higher degree, and 255 (26.4%) people had no formal qualifications. The median income was $26,100, compared with $31,800 nationally. 87 people (9.0%) earned over $70,000 compared to 17.2% nationally. The employment status of those at least 15 was that 477 (49.4%) people were employed full-time, 129 (13.4%) were part-time, and 66 (6.8%) were unemployed.

Marae

Maketu has two marae.

Whakaue or Tapiti Marae and its Whakaue Kaipapa meeting house are affiliated with the Ngāti Whakaue hapū of Ngāti Whakaue ki Maketū. In October 2020, the Government committed $4,525,104 from the Provincial Growth Fund to upgrade the marae and nine others, creating an estimated 34 jobs.

Te Awhe o te Rangi Marae and meeting house are a meeting place for the Ngāti Mākino hapū of Ngāti Mākino and Ngāti Te Awhe, and the Ngāti Pikiao hapū of Ngāti Pikiao. In October 2020, the Government committed $2,984,246 to upgrade the marae and 5 others, creating 20 jobs.

Education

References 

Western Bay of Plenty District
Populated places in the Bay of Plenty Region